Mohindroo is a surname. Notable people with the surname include:

Chelsea Mohindroo of The JMU Overtones and The Voice (U.S. season 4)
Sanjay Mohindroo, see Concerns and controversies over the 2010 Commonwealth Games